Sidney Abbott (July 11, 1937 – April 15, 2015) was an American feminist and lesbian activist and writer. A former member of the Lavender Menace, she co-authored Sappho Was a Right-on Woman: A Liberated View of Lesbianism with Barbara Love, and was one of the most vocal and active members in the National Organization for Women, helping the organization to focus on not just women's rights in general, but lesbian rights, as well.

Life and career
Sidney Afton Abbott was born in 1937 into a military family, describing herself as a military brat. She attended Smith College for three years, and graduated from the University of New Mexico in 1961. She then attended Columbia University for graduate school, studying urban planning.

In 1969 she joined the National Organization for Women (NOW) and became one of the first people to speak out for lesbian rights on panels at the New York chapter of NOW and at Columbia University. Abbott was a member of the Lavender Menace and co-authored Sappho Was a Right-on Woman: A Liberated View of Lesbianism in 1971, with Barbara Love.

In the mid-1970s, with Barbara Love, she lobbied for a NOW task force to be established to focus on lesbian issues, eventually it was established. NOW first named the task force the "sexuality and lesbian task force," and Abbott had to co-chair with a heterosexual woman. At the NOW national conference in Philadelphia in 1976, Abbott demanded that 1% of the organizations budget should go to the task force, and succeeded. During the conference, it was only one of two resolutions to pass.

Abbott served on the founding board of the National Gay and Lesbian Task Force, and worked to ensure the organization's board was equal numbers gay men and lesbian women. She was named by the Manhattan Borough President to the community planning board; she was the first openly gay person to do so. She also served as program developer for two departments in the New York City government. She was co-chair for the New York Performing Arts Center, and was politically active in the North Fork area of Long Island, New York.

Abbott and Kate Millett, Phyllis Birkby, Alma Routsong, and Artemis March were among the members of CR One, the first lesbian-feminist consciousness-raising group.

Later years
Abbott lived in Southold, New York. In 2007, she founded the Women's Rights are Human Rights nonprofit. In 2008, she started a newsletter, In Our Shoes, about politics, class, and poverty.  Her personal archives are located in the Sophia Smith Collection at Smith College and in the Radcliff College feminist collection of NOW biographies.

Death
Abbott died in a house fire in Southold, New York on April 15, 2015.

Works

References

1937 births
2015 deaths
20th-century American women writers
20th-century American LGBT people
21st-century American women writers
21st-century American LGBT people
Activists from New York (state)
American lesbian writers
Deaths from fire in the United States
Lavender Menace members
Lesbian feminists
LGBT people from New York (state)
National Organization for Women people
People from Suffolk County, New York
Place of birth missing